Guettarda ochreata is a species of plant in the family Rubiaceae. It is endemic to Peru.

References

ochreata
Endemic flora of Peru
Near threatened plants
Trees of Peru
Taxonomy articles created by Polbot